Margoon (Margun) Waterfall is located in the Fars province of Iran near the city of Sepidan. Its name means in Persian "snake like".
The height of the waterfall is 70 meters and its width is 100 m. The waterfall is located in the Margoon village, 48 kilometers from the city Ardakan in the Fars province. Margoon is one of the largest and most beautiful waterfalls in Iran. Margoon area is mountainous and has an elevation of over 2,200 meters above sea level. Weather is cold in the winter season. The waterfall can eventually freeze in particularly cold days. 
The distance from Margoon to Yasooj is 65 km and the distance from Margoon to Ardakan Fars is 48 km. It's possible to arrive, with car, at about 800 meters from the waterfall and then walking on a paved road with concrete steps.

External links

Iran's waterfalls

Waterfalls of Iran
Landforms of Fars Province